Aqua Teen Hunger Force (also known by various alternative titles) is an American adult animated television series that aired on Cartoon Network's late night programming block, Adult Swim. The show is about the surreal adventures and antics of three anthropomorphic fast food items: Master Shake, Frylock, and Meatwad, who live together as roommates in a neighborhood in the suburbs next door to a human named Carl Brutananadilewski.

An early version of the pilot episode originally aired months prior to the launch of Adult Swim on Cartoon Network unannounced on December 30, 2000. It later made its debut on Adult Swim on September 2, 2001, and ended on August 30, 2015, with a total of 139 episodes, over the course of eleven seasons. An episode titled "Boston" was scheduled to air during the fifth season, but was pulled to avoid further controversy surrounding the 2007 Boston Mooninite panic, and has never aired or formally released to the public legally in any format. In most seasons several episodes aired outside of their production order.

The series was created by Dave Willis and Matt Maiellaro, who wrote and directed every episode, and provided the voices of several characters. The series was inspired by the Space Ghost Coast to Coast episode "Baffler Meal", which was not produced until after Aqua Teen Hunger Force premiered and did not air until 2003. Seasons 8–11 were each given a different alternative title, as a running gag from series creators, who wanted to try to change things in the series. Each alternatively titled season features different theme music from various composers.

On April 13, 2007, a feature film based on the series, Aqua Teen Hunger Force Colon Movie Film for Theaters, premiered in theaters, marking the first time an original Adult Swim series was adapted into a feature-length film. The series also airs in syndication outside the United States and has been released on various DVD sets and other forms of home media, including on-demand streaming.

Series overview

Episodes

Pilots (1999-2003)

Note: Episodes are listed in the original production order

Season 1 (2000–02)

Season 2 (2003)

Season 3 (2004)

Season 4 (2005–06)

Season 5 (2008)

Season 6 (2009)

Season 7 (2009-10)

Aqua Unit Patrol Squad 1, Season 8 (2011)

Aqua Something You Know Whatever, Season 9 (2012)

Aqua TV Show Show, Season 10 (2013)

Aqua Teen Hunger Force Forever, Season 11 (2015)

Shorts

Aquadonk Side Pieces, Season 1 (2022)

Films

See also

 Aqua Teen Hunger Force Colon Movie Film for Theaters
 Aqua Teen Forever: Plantasm
 "Baffler Meal"

References
Informational notes
 1^ a b An unfinished version of "Carl Wash" originally aired unannounced at 3:30 am on December 22, 2006 and on January 21, 2007. The final cut of the episode later made its official debut on March 25, 2007.
 2^ The season seven episode "A PE Christmas" originally aired as an off-season Christmas special only twice on December 13, 2009. The episode was never rebroadcast again until it made its official premiere on March 14, 2010, where it aired as the fifth episode of the season in the television order. The official premiere featured the full ending that was not featured on either of the December 13, 2009 airings. The full ending has been featured in reruns of the episode ever since the March 14, 2010 debut.

Citations

External links

 
 

 
Lists of American sitcom episodes
Lists of American adult animated television series episodes